Coates is a small village close to the town of Whittlesey, in the English county of Cambridgeshire. Coates has a shop which includes a post office.

Description
The village has two greens, North Green and South Green, which are divided by the busy A605 road, which runs through the village. There is a small shop which includes a post office. Coates has a church, a chapel, a village hall and a primary school. Local businesses include a Chinese takeaway (Lucky House), two pubs (The Carpenters Arms and The Vine), a violin shop (Simon Watkin Violins) and a number of farms. It also has a war memorial on North Green. The village has its own fishing lake. It was awarded Fenland's best kept village in 1993. It is famous for its Petanque competitions as people from different countries such as the Netherlands and Austria come to compete.

There is a well supported traditional annual Village show with classes for farming, gardening, winemaking, cooking and photography, this being held jointly at Holy Trinity church and the Methodist Chapel.

History
The origins of the name are from the word 'Cotes', a corruption of cottages.  The village is referred to on ancient maps as 'Moreton's Cotes', with reference to Bishop Morton.

Churches
The Anglican church of the Holy Trinity was designed by architect James Wild in a brick interpretation of the Norman style and built in 1840.

The Methodist church on the North Green opened in the early 1840s, but closed in August 2012 when it faced £100,000 refurbishment costs.

Recent events
Part of the filming for the 2007 war film Atonement starring Keira Knightley was filmed outside Coates at the end of Eldernell Lane.

References

External links

Villages in Cambridgeshire
Whittlesey